The following is a list of notable deaths in January 1991.

Entries for each day are listed alphabetically by surname. A typical entry lists information in the following sequence:
 Name, age, country of citizenship at birth, subsequent country of citizenship (if applicable), reason for notability, cause of death (if known), and reference.

January 1991

1
Inga Gentzel, 82, Swedish Olympic runner (1928).
Dáithí Ó Conaill, 52, Irish politician and republican.
Jerome Arthur Pechillo, 71, American Roman Catholic prelate.
Nicolae Petrescu, 77, Romanian football player and manager.
Buck Ram, 83, American songwriter and music producer.

2
Sydney Caine, 88, British economist and educator.
Edmond Jabès, 78, Egyptian-French writer and poet.
Joseph C. Fegan Jr., 70, United States Marine Corps general, cancer.
Irving Johnson, 85, American sailor, adventurer, and writer.
Hiroshi Noma, 75, Japanese writer, cancer.
Gilbert Price, 48, American actor, asphyxiation.
Habib Ibrahim Rahimtoola, 78, Pakistani politician.
Renato Rascel, 78, Italian actor and singer, heart attack.
Joseph J. Spengler, 88, American economist, Alzheimer's disease.

3
Fayeq Abdul-Jaleel, 42, Kuwaiti poet, playwright and lyricist, execution.
Luke Appling, 83, American baseball player.
João Azevedo, 75, Portuguese footballer.
Tom Baker, 77, American baseball player.
Anna Gmeyner, 88, Austrian-English writer.
Cipe Pineles, 82, Austrian-American graphic designer, heart attack.
Reuben Tam, 74, American painter, lymphoma.
Doris Zinkeisen, 92, Scottish theatrical designer.

4
Eddie Barefield, 81, American jazz musician, heart attack.
Bill Byrd, 83, American baseball player.
Joe Hoague, 72, American football player.
Berry Kroeger, 78, American actor, kidney failure.
Ib Storm Larsen, 65, Danish Olympic rower (1948).
Zvonko Lepetić, 62, Yugoslav actor, heart attack.
Poon Lim, 72, Chinese sailor.
Richard Maibaum, 81, American playwright and screenwriter (Dr. No, Goldfinger, From Russia with Love).
Thomas Stanley Matthews, 89, American magazine editor, lung cancer.
Tokushige Noto, 88, Japanese Olympic sprinter (1924).
Eric Rodin, 60, American baseball player.
Sanmao, 47, Chinese-born Taiwanese writer and translator, suicide by hanging.
Jayantilal Chhotalal Shah, 84, Indian judge and Chief Justice of India.
Leo Wright, 57, American jazz musician, heart attack.

5
Hubert Butler, 90, Irish writer.
Johnny Eck, 79, American freak show performer and actor (Freaks), heart attack.
Tõnis Kint, 94, Estonian politician.
Walt Lamb, 70, American football player.
Vasko Popa, 68, Yugoslav poet.
Ted Robertson, 61, Australian politician.

6
Ed Beinor, 73, American gridiron football player.
Heinrich Dathe, 80, German zoologist, cancer.
Bobby Estalella, 79, Cuban baseball player.
Antonio Blanco Freijeiro, 67, Spanish archaeologist.
Nicholas Marsicano, 82, American painter.
Ravikant Nagaich, 59, Indian filmmaker.
Marko Nikezić, 69, Yugoslav politician.
Ahmed Adnan Saygun, 83, Turkish composer and musicologist.
Alan Wiggins, 32, American baseball player (San Diego Padres, Baltimore Orioles), AIDS.

7
Kondrat Krapiva, 94, Soviet writer.
Henri Louveau, 80, French racing driver.
José Guilherme Merquior, 49, Brazilian writer and diplomat, cancer.
Josef Stroh, 77, Austrian football player and manager.
Charlotte Wynters, 91, American actress.

8
Steve Clark, 30, English guitarist and songwriter (Def Leppard), alcohol poisoning.
Ursula Hirschmann, 77, German anti-fascist.
Henry Rainsford Hulme, 82, British nuclear physicist.
Windy Nicklaus, 87, American gridiron football player.

9
Salatyn Asgarova, 29, Soviet journalist, shot.
Cuthbert Bardsley, 83, British Anglican prelate.
J. McVicker Hunt, 84, American psychologist.
Roland Laudenbach, 69, French writer, editor, and journalist.
Antonio León Ortega, 83, Spanish sculptor.
Soemarno Sosroatmodjo, 79, Indonesian politician.
Charles Sterling, 89, Polish-French art historian.

10
Eva Bosáková, 59, Czechoslovak Olympic gymnast (1952, 1956, 1960).
Malte Jaeger, 79, German actor, embolism.
Richard Kuremaa, 78, Estonian football player.
Bob Wallis, 56, British jazz musician.

11
Carl David Anderson, 85, American physicist, Nobel Prize recipient (1936).
Garland Frazier, 73, American sports coach.
Maxine Jennings, 81, American actress.
Sepp Ketterer, 91, Austrian cinematographer.
Jaroslav Kučera, 61, Czech cinematographer.
Sarangapani Raman, 70-71, Indian football player.
Alec Rose, 82, English sailor.
Ronald Sanders, 58, American journalist.
Georg Schäfer, 64, German writer, heart attack.

12
Charles Drury, 78, Canadian politician.
Eric Evans, 69, English rugby player.
Robert Jackson, 79, Australian public servant.
Keye Luke, 86, Chinese-American actor (Kung Fu, The Green Hornet, Gremlins), stroke.
Doug McEnulty, 68, American football player.
Vasco Pratolini, 77, Italian writer.
Niels Rasmussen, 68, Danish Olympic rower (1948).
Arthur L. White, 83, American Seventh-day Adventist writer, and theology professor.

13
François Falc'hun, 89, French linguist.
Tribhuvandas Luhar, 82, Indian poet.
Eladio Rojas, 56, Chilean football player.
Ed Williamson, 78, American football coach, cancer.

14
David Arkin, 49, American actor (All the President's Men, M*A*S*H, The Long Goodbye), suicide.
Duncan Black, 82, Scottish economist.
Gordon Bryant, 76, Australian politician.
Chitragupta, 73, Indian composer.
Donald Coleman, 65, British politician, heart attack.
Miles Copeland, Jr., 74, American musician and CIA officer, heart attack.
Heli Finkenzeller, 76, German actress.
Irwin Goodman, 47, Finnish singer, heart attack.
Salah Khalaf, 57-58, Palestinian politician, shot.
Harry Shorten, 77, American writer, editor, and book publisher.
Roger Tubby, 80, American diplomat and press secretary.

15
Leona Baumgartner, 88, American physician.
Vishwa Gopal Jhingran, 72, Indian zoologist.
Lyle Judy, 77, American baseball player.
Julius Podlipny, 92, Czechoslovak and Romanian artist.
Karl L. Rankin, 92, American diplomat, prostate cancer.
Tony Slydini, 90, Italian-American magician.
Bob Stirling, 71, English rugby union player.

16
Preston Cloud, 78, American paleontologist, pneumonia.
Rinaldo Del Bo, 74, Italian politician.
Nicholas Mansergh, 80, British historian.
Jabbo Smith, 82, American jazz musician.

17
Marv Breuer, 76, American baseball player.
Giacomo Manzù, 82, Italian sculptor.
John C. Morgan, 76, American Air Force pilot and Medal of Honor recipient, Alzheimer's disease.
Paul Mross, 80, Polish-German chess player.
Olav V of Norway, 87, Norwegian royal, king (since 1957), heart attack.
Scott Speicher, 33, United States Navy aviator, killed in action.

18
Bryan Alton, 71, Irish politician and physician.
Charles W. Davis, 73, American soldier and Medal of Honor recipient.
Hamilton Fish III, 102, American politician, member of the U.S. House of Representatives (1920–1945).
Vic Fusia, 77, American gridiron football player and coach, heart attack.
Leo Hurwitz, 81, American documentary filmmaker, colon cancer.
Jakob Kiefer, 71, German Olympic gymnast (1952, 1956).

19
Uzeir Abduramanov, 74, Soviet Red Army officer and war hero during World War II.
Don Beddoe, 87, American actor.
Paul Bikle, 74, American aeronautical engineer.
Winston H. Bostick, 74, American physicist, lung cancer.
Marcel Chaput, 72, Canadian Quebecois independence activist.
Bobby Combe, 66, Scottish footballer.
Gernot Reinstadler, 20, Austrian skier, skiing accident.
John Russell, 70, American actor (Rio Bravo, Pale Rider, The Outlaw Josey Wales), emphysema.
Roy Weatherly, 75, American baseball player.

20
Joseph Carroll, 80, American general, Alzheimer's disease.
Harry Giese, 87, German actor and narrator.
Louis Hardiquest, 80, Belgian cyclist.
Herbie Lewis, 85, Canadian ice hockey player.
Owen Madden, 74, Irish footballer.
Frank Pfütze, 32, German Olympic swimmer (1976, 1980), heart failure.
Louis Seigner, 87, French actor, house fire.
James Stewart, 84, American Olympic athlete (1928).
Stan Szelest, 48, American musician, heart attack.
Alfred Wainwright, 84, British writer.
Aldert van der Ziel, 80, Dutch physicist.

21
Cornelia Aalten, 77, Dutch Olympic runner (1932).
Muhammad Taqi Amini, 64, Indian theologian.
John Bicknell Auden, 87, English geologist.
Ganga Devi, 63, Indian painter.
James W. Duckett, 79, American military academic.
Mieczysław Gracz, 71, Polish footballer.
Nick Gulas, 76, American professional wrestling promoter.
Frank Mitchell, 85, American actor, cardiac arrest.
Princess Ileana of Romania, 82, Romanian royal, heart attack.

22
Kenos Aroi, 48, Nauruan politician, president (1989).
Robert Choquette, 85, Canadian novelist.
Les Gore, 77, English footballer.
Arnholdt Kongsgaard, 76, Norwegian skier and Olympian.
Kristo Kono, 83, Albanian composer.

23
Northrop Frye, 78, Canadian literary critic and theorist.
Herbert Fröhlich, 85, German-British physicist.
Ester Graff, 93, Danish feminist and businesswoman.
Václav Janeček, 61, Czechoslovak Olympic sprinter (1952, 1956).
Annie Markart, 83, German actress.
P. Padmarajan, 45, Indian film maker, screenwriter and author, cardiac arrest.
Nikolai Talyzin, 61, Soviet economist.
Luis Hernán Álvarez, 52, Chilean footballer, stomach cancer.

24
Rūdolfs Bārda, 87, Soviet footballer.
Everett Freeman, 79, American screenwriter.
John M. Kelly, 59, Irish politician, heart attack.
John Middleton, 84, British Olympic racing cyclist (1928).
Sarashi Ranjan Mukherjee, 71, Indian surgeon and a neurobiologist.
Jack Schaefer, 83, American writer, heart failure.
Sensitive Prince, 15, American thoroughbred racehorse.

25
Lilian Bond, 83, English-American actress, heart attack.
Stanley Brock, 59, American actor (Days of Our Lives, UHF, He's the Mayor), heart attack.
Diana Turbay castillo, 40, Colombian journalist, shot.
Hoot Evers, 69, American baseball player, heart attack.
Per Gjelten, 63, Norwegian Olympic skier (1952).
Fiorenzo Marini, 76, Italian Olympic fencer (1948, 1960).
Ismail Marjan, 70, Singaporean badminton player.
Lafran Pane, 69, Indonesian academic, traffic collision.
Gino Pollini, 88, Italian architect.
Frank Soo, 76, English footballer, dementia.

26
Des Koch, 58, American Olympic discus thrower (1956).
Glenn Langan, 73, American actor, lymphoma.
Orestes López, 82, Cuban musician.
Hans Strååt, 73, Swedish actor.
Johnny van Doorn, 46, Dutch writer, cancer.
Karen Young, 39, American disco singer, peptic ulcer bleeding.

27
Zheng Dongguo, 88, Chinese National Revolutionary Army officer.
George Hazelwood Locket, 90, British arachnologist.
Dale Long, 64, American baseball player, cancer.
Miroslav Válek, 63, Czechoslovak poet and politician.
Leif Wikström, 72, Swedish Olympic sailor (1956).

28
Red Grange, 87, American gridiron football player,Parkinson's disease.
Christopher Jackman, 74, American politician.
Nikola Radović, 57, Yugoslav football player.
Alexander M. Schmidt, 60, American physician and government official, coronary artery disease.

29
Jal Cursetji, 71, Indian naval admiral.
Ingebrigt Davik, 65, Norwegian children's writer, singer and songwriter..
Hasan Dosti, 96, Albanian politician.
Yasushi Inoue, 83, Japanese writer.
Władysław Król, 83, Polish ice hockey and football player and coach.
V. N. Navaratnam, 61, Sri Lankan politician, heart attack.
Arne Robertsson, 48, Swedish wrestler and Olympian.
Joe Stynes, 88, Irish footballer.

30
John Bardeen, 82, American physicist, Nobel Prize recipient (1956, 1972), heart attack.
Kurt Bittel, 83, German prehistorian.
Clifton C. Edom, 83, American photojournalist.
Rhys Lloyd, Baron Lloyd of Kilgerran, 83, Welsh politician.
John McIntire, 83, American actor (Wagon Train, Psycho, Turner & Hooch), lung cancer.
José Ferrater Mora, 78, Spanish philosopher, heart attack.

31
Robert J. Havighurst, 90, American chemist, Alzheimer's disease.
Márcio Melo, 84, Brazilian politician.
Kostas Mountakis, 64, Greek musician.
Åge Rønning, 65, Norwegian writer  and journalist.
Justin Apostol, 69, Romanian football player.

References 

1991-01
 01